Ilolo Izu (born May 28, 1997) is an American sprinter, specialized in the 400 metres hurdles and 400 metres.

Biography
Ilolo Izu was born in Arlington, Texas and attended Strake Jesuit College Preparatory for high school, and Texas A&M for college. He competed as a sprinter-hurdler for Texas A&M Aggies from 2015 to 2019, ending a multiple-time NCAA All-American. He was the 2018 and 2019 Texas Relays winner of the 400 m hs. With a time of 3:01.39 on 10 March 2018 he set the world record in the 4x400 meters relay indoor by competing for Texas A&M at the 2018 NCAA Division I Indoor Track and Field Championships.

World records
 4x400 metres relay indoor: 3:01.39 ( College Station, Texas, 10 March 2018 with Robert Grant, Devin Dixon, Mylik Kerley)

Achievements

National championship results

References

External links
 

1997 births
American male hurdlers
American male sprinters
Living people
Texas A&M Aggies men's track and field athletes
Track and field athletes from Texas